Lee Eun-sang (October 22, 1903 - September 18, 1982) was a Korean poet and historian. He was dedicated to the revival and modernization of sijo, a form of Korean poetry.

Early life
Lee Eun-sang was born on October 22, 1903 at Sangnam-dong, Masan in Korea. In 1918, he graduated from the Changshin High School (창신고등학교) which his father had established, and in 1923, he entered the department of liberal arts at Yonhee College, the predecessor of Yonsei University. He withdrew in 1923.  He worked for Changshin School as a teacher for a time until he enrolled at Waseda University in Japan, majoring in history in 1925. He worked at Ewha Womans University as a professor from 1931 to 1932. After that, he worked for Dong-a Ilbo and Chosun Ilbo (Korean newspapers).

In 1942, he was arrested on the suspicion of being implicated in the so-called "incident of Chosun Language Academy" (조선어학회사건), and was released the next year when his indictment suspended. In 1945, he was detained in custody as a political offender at the Gwang-yang police station and was released at the time of independence from Japan.

After Korea's liberation from Japan, Lee taught at Cheong-gu University, Seoul National University, and Young-nam University. In 1954, he was invited to join the Korean Academy of the Arts, and by 1978 he had achieved a life-time membership in the Korean Academy of the Arts. Lee served as the chairman of the Admiral Lee Sun-sin Memorial Committee, a member of the Korea Alpinist's Association, the Korea Culture Preservation Association, and the People's Culture Association, as well as being Editor-in-Chief for the History of Korea Independence Movements.

Lee won the Rose of Sharon National Medal of Honor in 1970, and died in 1982.

Works
In his childhood, Lee and his friends enjoyed playing near a stream close to his house on the hills of Mount No-bi-san. Whenever he visited Masan, his hometown, later in life, he went to the stream as it reminded him of his childhood. The poems Climbing Up the Old Hill and Symphony of Spring both depict the days when he played on the hill of Mount Nobisan. One of his motivations for writing poetry in the  sijo form is that his father would recited it to him when he was a child.

In 1921, the poem Hyul-jo was published for the first time, in Ah-sung, volume 4, under the pen name Du-wu-seong.

Lee Eun Sang earned a reputation as a poet who opened up a new modern free form of sijo. Most of his poems became lyrics for classical style songs. Nosan Sijo-jip, his first volume of poetry, was published in 1932. The works integrated characteristics of homesickness, sentimentality, and the beauty of nature. The poems Memory of Hometown, Ga-go-pa, and  Night of Seong-bul Temple  are filled with lyricism.

His deep lyricism in poems such as Bom-cheo-nyeo [Maid of Spring](봄처녀) and 'Ga-go-pa' [Longing to Go Home] (가고파), and his mastery of sijo style into a new style, he is considered the best poet in the revival of sijo in modern era.
His Dong-hae-song (동해송) and High Ground is Over There are celebrated as a great accomplishments.

He was a historian and a scholar of classical studies.  Among his many achievements in these fields, the most notable is the translation into modern Korean the Admiral Lee Sun-Shin's "Diary of Battles of Im-Jin War" [Journals Kept During the Hideyoshi Invasion of 1592]

The Korea Literature Translation Institute, summarizes Lee's contributions to Korean literature as follows:

A poet notable standing for his evolving style, Lee Eunsang’s career consists of several distinct stages. When he made his literary debut in 1923, his poetic works were almost entirely in free verse form, and he also published critical essays on Western poets such as Whitman and Tennyson. It was only later on that Lee developed the passionate interest in Sijo, a traditional Korean poetic genre that was first invented during the Goryeo Dynasty, in the late thirteenth and early fourteenth centuries, consisting of a set rhythm pattern usually involving the systematic arrangement of lines in three and four syllables each. In the five hundred years that followed its invention, Sijo remained Korea’s most popular form of verse, but it had long since lost its mass appeal by the early twentieth century.

In the mid-1920s, the poet Lee Byeonggi began his well-known efforts preserve and revive the Sijo art form, and it is Lee Eunsang who is known to have joined him in his quest and matched him in his fervor. Both poets published numerous critical essays supporting the art form of Sijo with sound theoretical background and calling for the modernization that they felt was necessary in order to regain mass appeal. The actual Sijo poems of Lee Byeonggi and Lee Eunsang, however, were distinctly different in both style and tone despite the fact that they both contributed to the restoration of the genre to its prominent position in Korean literature. While Lee Byeonggi’s technical innovations largely involved lengthening the Sijo verses and where his style was exquisitely refined, Lee Eunsang concentrated on condensing the three line poems even further into two lines, resulting in original works that were short but extremely dynamic and powerful. Lee Eunsang went on to create a new Sijo-form he called ‘Yangjangsijo,’ consisting of less disruptive line breaks and a smoother rhythm. Several of his ‘Yangjangsijo’ poems, such as “Gagopa,” “Seongbulsaui Bam,”and “Yetdongsane Olla,” were converted into song lyrics, and aided the popularization of Sijo a great deal.

After the Korean War, Lee Eunsang began to take a decided interest in the significance of historical context and its effect on literary works. The central themes of his earlier stages vary a great deal: for example, in poems such as “Ganeun Gonmada” and “Songdo Norae” from his first collection Collected Sijo of Nosan (Nosan sijojip, 1932), treat of recollection and the love of history in general, but with “Heureneun Bombit”and “Sseulsseulhan Geunal,” he addresses feelings regarding nature and personal experiences. In sharp contrast, the poems from this new, post-war period reflect Lee’s newfound sense of social and political awareness, treating of subjects such as the pain of national division, the memories of patriots, and the glorification of the Korean nation.

Awards
In 1969, he was awarded the Presidential Prize, and in 1970, the National Medal of Honor, Republic of Korea, Mu-gung-hwa-jang The Medal of Rose of Sharon.

References 

 Kim Sang-sun. "On the Shijo (Koren Liric) of Lee un-sang." Korean Literature,  May 1985. vol.93 n.1 p. 209-229.
 Park Sang-gon. "A Study on Lee Eun-sang's shijo." KNUE, 1992. 
 Lee Sung-won. "The Status of Lee Eun-sang's shijo." A Collection of Treatises about Human Knowledge, vol.10. Aug. 2003. p. 5-20.
 Oh Seung-hui. "A Study of Space on Lee Eun-sang's shijo." 
KNUE,  The Korean Language Research Institute.  Jan.1996. vol.5 p. 93-116.
 Oh Se-yeong. "A theory of Modern Korean Traditional Verse Writer."  Taihaksa,  2001.  p. 51-65.
 Nosan Literature Compilation Committee. "Nosan's Literature and Human." Hwatbulsa, 1983.
 The Korean Literature Compilation Committee. "Korean Literature Data Dictionary", Hanguksajeonyeongusa, 1995.
 https://web.archive.org/web/20081206154918/http://english.masan.go.kr/
 "The Korean Literature Compilation Committee", Garamgihoek, (1995).
 "The Korean Modern Literature Dictionary", Han-guk-sajeon-yeon-gu-sa, (2000).

1903 births
1982 deaths
Korean male poets
20th-century Korean poets
Korean historians
20th-century male writers
20th-century historians